Pedro Guimarães is a Brazilian economist. He had served as chairman of Caixa Econômica Federal from 2019 to 2022 and former partner of the investment bank Brasil Plural.

Guimarães resigned from office after accusations of sexual abuse against women employees of the state-owned bank were published by Metrópoles. The case is in a confidential investigation conducted by the Federal Public Prosecutor's Office since late 2021.

Early life 
He was born in Rio de Janeiro. He earned Pedro Guimarães a Ph.D. in economics from the University of Rochester, Master in Economics from Fundação Getúlio Vargas of Rio de Janeiro (FGV-RJ) and Bachelor of Economics from Pontifical Catholic University of Rio de Janeiro (PUC-Rio).

Career 
He specialized in privatizations in the U.S. and in Brazil and signaled that the bank expects to save R$3,5 billion in two years and revised deals to achieve this goal.

He was a member of the Board of Directors of Terra Brasis Resseguros and Eólicas do Sul.

He was an advisor for the Privatization programme in the Banespa, the oldest state bank of São Paulo.

Sexual Harassment 
On June 28, 2022, the Brazilian website Metrópoles published an article with multiple reports from Caixa's female employees stating that Pedro Guimarães would, in several occasions, sexually harassed them, trying to force his employees to initiate sexual relations with him. The employees' initiative resulted in a formal investigation from Ministério Público Federal, this being the first public case of sexual harassment involving a high rank employee from Jair Bolsonaro's government.

According to O Globo journal, Pedro Guimarães would have already been reported fro sexual harassment by a colleague in another bank. Such case was supposedly concluded after the payment of a fine by the company to the other party.

References

Year of birth missing (living people)
Living people
Brazilian chairpersons of corporations
Brazilian economists
Fundação Getulio Vargas alumni
Pontifical Catholic University of Rio de Janeiro alumni
University of Rochester alumni